The Australian motorcycle Grand Prix is a motorcycling event that is part of the Grand Prix motorcycle racing season. From 1997 to the present day, it is run at the scenic Phillip Island Grand Prix Circuit south-southeast of Melbourne, Victoria. Prior to 1997 the event was held at a number of different venues, most notably Eastern Creek west of Sydney New South Wales and Bathurst in central western New South Wales. The only rider to win the 'premier class' race at multiple venues is five-time World Champion Mick Doohan, Eastern Creek (1992, 1995) and Phillip Island (1998).

The race was cancelled in 2020 and 2021, both due to the COVID-19 pandemic. The event is due to take place at the Phillip Island Grand Prix Circuit until at least 2026.

Official names and sponsors
1989: Swan Premium Australian Motorcycle Grand Prix
1990: Drink/Drive Australian Motorcycle Grand Prix
1991: Tooheys Australian Motorcycle Grand Prix
1992–1994: Foster's Australian Motorcycle Grand Prix
1995–1997: Australian Motorcycle Grand Prix (no official sponsor)
1998–2001: Qantas Australian Grand Prix
2002–2003: SKYY vodka Australian Grand Prix
2004: Cinzano Australian Grand Prix
2005: Polini Australian Grand Prix
2006–2007: GMC Australian Grand Prix
2008: Australian Grand Prix (no official sponsor)
2009–2011: Iveco Australian Motorcycle Grand Prix
2012: AirAsia Australian Motorcycle Grand Prix
2013–2014: Tissot Australian Motorcycle Grand Prix
2015: Pramac Australian Motorcycle Grand Prix
2016–2018: Michelin Australian Motorcycle Grand Prix
2019: Pramac Generac Australian Motorcycle Grand Prix
2022–present: Animoca Brands Australian Motorcycle Grand Prix

Spectator attendance

2007: 50.425

Winners of the Australian motorcycle Grand Prix

Most wins (riders)

Multiple winners (manufacturers)

By year

Riots at Bathurst

The Bathurst motorcycle race riots, or Easter Motorcycle riots were a series of disturbances between 1980 and 1985 involving motorsport spectators and the New South Wales Police Force Tactical Response Group during the Australian motorcycle Grand Prix.

Following the 1985 race meeting, the Bathurst Regional Council placed a total ban on spectators taking their own alcohol into events at the Mount Panorama Circuit. This ban has subsequently been revoked. The council also put a limit on the number of drinks spectators could purchase per day from the outlets at the track. This also had a flow on effect for the circuits other annual event, the Bathurst 1000 touring car race held on the October long weekend, though traditionally the Bathurst 1000 crowd was much better behaved.

See also
Motorsport in Australia
List of Australian motor racing series

References

 
Motorsport at Phillip Island
Sports competitions in Melbourne
Recurring sporting events established in 1914
1914 establishments in Australia